Carl Sylvius Völkner ( – 2 March 1865) was a German-born Protestant missionary in New Zealand who was hanged and decapitated at his church grounds on the east coast of the North Island in what became known as the Völkner Incident.

Biography 

Völkner was born in the town of Kassel, in the Electorate of Hesse, Germany, around 1819. He was sent to New Zealand by the North German Missionary Society, along with several other missionaries, having received training at the missionary college at Hamburg. He arrived in the country in August 1849 and was sent to Taranaki, to work alongside another German missionary, Johann Riemenschneider.

In 1852 Völkner offered his services to the Church Missionary Society (CMS). He married Emma Lanfear, sister of a CMS missionary on 29 June 1854. For several years he worked as a lay teacher in the lower Waikato and in 1857 became a naturalised citizen. Völkner was ordained a deacon in 1860 and the following year, in August, he became a priest and took charge of the CMS mission station at Ōpōtiki. The local iwi (tribe) was Te Whakatōhea and soon a church and school were built in the area.

Death 

On 19 May 1864 Völkner recorded that four of the 16 Christian teachers of the Ōpōtiki district had accompanied a Pai Mārire (Hauhau) campaign to Maketu, although not as active participants in the fighting. He went to Auckland during 1864 and again in January 1865. He was then warned by members of Te Whakatōhea not to return to Ōpōtiki.

Ignoring the warning, Völkner returned to Ōpōtiki on 1 March 1865 and was apprehended by the Pai Mārire led by Patara, a chief, and Kereopa Te Rau, a Pai Mārire prophet. Völkner was hanged the following day from a willow tree near the church by his own Whakatōhea congregation. He was taken down and decapitated, and his eyes were gouged out and swallowed by Kereopa Te Rau. The Revd Thomas Grace, who was also in Ōpōtiki, was also taken by the Pai Mārire, although he was rescued.

Legacy 

The Anglican church in Ōpōtiki was reconsecrated as St Stephen the Martyr in memory of his death on 21 November 1875. His bible, chalice and paten are still held at the church. After pardon was later granted to those involved in Völkner’s death, the church was renamed again as Hiona St Stephen’s on 5 June 1994

Te Paepae o Aotea, also known the Volkner Rocks, are named after him.

See also
Völkner Incident
Christianity in New Zealand

Footnotes

References
 Lyall, A. C., (1979) Whakatohea of Opotiki. A.H. & A.W. Reed.
  Chapter 5: The Völkner and Fulloon Slayings, in The Ngati Awa Raupatu Report. Waitangi Tribunal, 1999.

1819 births
1865 deaths
German Anglican priests
German Anglican missionaries
Anglican missionaries in New Zealand
Volkner, Carl Sylvius
People murdered in New Zealand
19th-century Protestant martyrs
German expatriates in New Zealand
German Presbyterian missionaries
Presbyterian missionaries in New Zealand